Denis & Denis was a Croatian and Yugoslav synth-pop group formed in Rijeka in 1982. They were one of the most popular acts of the Yugoslav synth-pop scene.

Formed as a duo consisting of keyboardist and vocalist Davor Tolja and vocalist Marina Perazić, Denis & Denis immediately gained attention of the Yugoslav audience with their first recordings broadcast on Yugoslav radio stations. Their debut album, Čuvaj se!, released in 1984, brought them nationwide popularity, Perazić becoming one of the biggest sex symbols of the Yugoslav rock scene. Their second album, Ja sam lažljiva, was recorded during Tolja's military leaves from the Yugoslav army, so for the live performances he was replaced by Edi Kraljić, his former bandmate from the band Linija 32. Ja sam lažljiva brought new hits and increased the group's popularity. After Tolja's return from the army, the group continued working as a trio consisting of Tolja, Perazić and Kraljić. After Perazić left the group in 1986 to start a solo career, Tolja and Kraljić continued working as Denis & Denis, turning towards pop rock sound. After the release of the album Budi tu in 1988, the group disbanded, Tolja dedicating himself to work in studio.

In 2012, Tolja, Perazić and Krajić reunited in order to mark 30 years since the group's formation with a series of concerts in Croatia and former Yugoslav republics. The performances featured new vocalist, Ruby Montanari Knez, with whom Tolja recorded fourth Denis & Denis album, Restart, released in 2014. During the following years, the band performed occasionally, ending their activity in 2019.

History

The beginnings (1977–1982)
Keyboardist Davor Tolja started his career at the end of the 1970s in the art rock band Vrijeme i Zemlja, and after the group disbanded, continued working with the bands Termiti and Beta Centaury, also making a guest appearance on the debut album by the band Xenia. He formed the band Linija 32 (Line 32), which featured former Beta Centaury vocalist Edi Kraljić. The band managed to perform at the prominent Subotica Youth Festival, but was short-lived, as at one point all of the members except Tolja had to serve their mandatory stints in the Yugoslav army. After Linija 32 disbanded, Tolja formed a one-off band Toljina Funk Selekcija (Tolja's Funk Selection) for an edition of RI Rock Festival. The band featured vocalist Marina Perazić, who was at the time a civil engineering student. Prior to Toljina Funk Selekcija, Perazić was a member of the choir Jeka Primorja (Echo of the Coastline) and the multimedia group Sigma Tau. After Toljina Funk Selekcija disbanded, Tolja and Perazić recorded the song "Zimski vjetar" ("Winter Wind") with chanson singer Damir Pandur for the Zagreb Music Festival. Tolja played and did the arrangements for the song, and Perazić recorded backing vocals. The song was released on the festival's official compilation album ZagrebFest – Šansone (ZagrebFest – Chansons) in 1982.

Marina Perazić years: Peak of popularity (1982–1986)
In the summer of 1982, Tolja and Perazić formed the synth-pop duo Denis & Denis. The band made demo recordings which were broadcast on radio stations in Rijeka, Zagreb and Belgrade and attracted the audience's attention. At the end of 1982, the duo had their first live performance, appearing as the opening band at a Boa concert in Rijeka's Youth Hall. 

In 1984, the band released their debut album, Čuvaj se! (Take Care!), through Jugoton record label. The album was produced by Tolja and Andrej Baša and featured guest appearances by Dorian Gray frontman, Massimo Savić on guitar, and future Let 3 member Zoran Prodanović "Prlja" and Tolja's former bandmate from Linija 32 Edi Kraljić on vocals. The album brought nationwide popularity to the group, the song "Program tvog kompjutera" ("A Program of Your Computer") becoming a major hit and Marina Perazić being described by the Yugoslav press as a sex symbol. At the end of the year, Čuvaj se! was voted the Album of the Year by both music critics and readers of the magazine Rock.

During 1985, Tolja was serving his stint in the Yugoslav army. During his military leaves, he and Perazić recorded the mini-album Ja sam lažljiva (I'm Deceptive). The music was composed by Tolja, and the lyrics were written by Domenika Vasić, Alka Vuica and Mladen Popović. The audio cassette version of the album featured two additional tracks, demo recordings made by Tolja in 1982. On promotional performances, Edi Kraljić stepped in as the replacement for Tolja, and also appeared in promotional videos recorded for the songs from Ja sam lažljiva. The album brought the hits "Ja sam lažljiva", "Voli me još ovu noć" ("Love Me for Just One More Night") and "Soba 23" ("Room 23"), the latter followed by an erotic music video, and increased the group's popularity. That same year, director Dinko Tucaković made the science fiction TV film entitled Denis & Denis for Television Belgrade. The film was shot at Košutnjak Film Studios, starred Perazić and Kraljić and featured Denis & Denis songs. Also that year, Perazić also recorded the song "Plava jutra" ("Blue Mornings") with Rex Ilusivii and took part in the YU Rock Misija project, a Yugoslav contribution to Live Aid, contributing vocals to the song "Za Milion Godina".  In addition, Denis & Denis performed at the corresponding charity concert held at the Red Star Stadium in Belgrade. At the end of the year, in Rock magazine, Marina Perazić was voted Female Vocalist of the Year and the Sexiest Person on the Yugoslav Scene, and the "Ja sam lažljiva" video was voted Music Video of the Year.

After Tolja's return from the army, Denis & Denis continued as a trio consisting of Tolja, Perazić and Kraljić. The group appeared at the 1986 MESAM festival with the song "Oaze snova" ("Oases of Dreams"), winning the Best Female Vocalist Award, and at the 1986 Jugovizija festival in Pristina with the song "Braća Grim i Andersen" ("Brothers Grimm and Andersen"), winning third place. At the end of 1986, Perazić left the group to start a solo career.

Without Perazić: Shift to pop rock and disbandment (1986–1988)
Tolja and Kraljić continued to work as Denis & Denis, forming a backing band consisting of their former bandmates from Linija 32. In 1988, they released the album Budi tu (Be There), which marked the group's shift toward pop rock and power pop sound. The songs were composed by Tolja, who also wrote lyrics for one of the songs, while the rest of the lyrics were written by Kraljić, Mladen Popović and Riblja Čorba frontman Bora Đorđević. The album brought minor hits "Bengalski tigar" ("Bengal Tiger") and "Miris krila anđela"("Smell of the Angel's Wings"). After a series of promotional concerts, the group ended its activity.

Post breakup

Perazić released her debut solo album, entitled Marina, in 1987. A year later, with husband Ivan Fece "Firchie" (former drummer of the band Ekatarina Velika) she moved to New York City. For a decade she did not record or perform. After Fece and her divorced in 1997, she returned to Rijeka, but choose Belgrade as her career base. In 1998, she released her comeback album Ista kao more (The Same as the Sea). In 2004, she released the single "Sex bez dodira" ("Sex Without Touch"), which is her latest solo release. During the following years, she performed in clubs across the region. In the 2010s, she started performing as a DJ.

Tolja turned towards work in studio, working as a producer. In 1989, he released the pop-oriented solo album Stari mačak (Old Cat), which he recorded with guitarist Elvis Stanić. After the outbreak of the Yugoslav Wars, he initiated Riječki Band Aid (Rijeka Band Aid) project, with which he recorded the single "Sretan Božić i Nova godina" ("Merry Christmas and a Happy New Year"). He participated in the Split '92 music festival with the song "S okusom mora" ("With the Taste of the Sea") and the 1993 Opatija festival with the song "Sanjaj me" ("Dream of Me"), performing the latter with vocalist Mateo of the band Putokaz (Signpost). For the various artist compilation album Zaje'no za mir (To'ether for Peace) he recorded the song "Techno Army". He wrote the song  "Probudi me" ("Wake Me Up") performed by the Croatian group E.N.I. on the 1997 Eurovision Song Contest.

Reunion and new incarnation of the band (2012–2019)
In 2012, Tolja, Perazić and Kraljić reunited in order to mark 30 years since the band's formation. The reunited Denis & Denis also featured a new vocalist, young singer Ruby Montanari Knez. The group held their first performance since the late 1980s on 7 December 2012 in Tvornica kulture hall in Zagreb, and on the New Year's Eve they held a concert on Rijeka main city square, which was followed by concerts in the region. In 2013, Tolja and Ruby Montanari Knez recorded the fourth Denis & Denis album, entitled Restart. The album was mostly pop-oriented and was met with mostly negative reactions by the music critics. Despite the fact that only Montanari Knez took part in the album recording, on the concerts which followed the album release, Perazić and Kraljić also performed with the group. In the following years, the band performed occasionally, the COVID-19 pandemic ending their activity.

Legacy 
In 2015, Čuvaj se! was polled No.65 on the list of 100 Greatest Yugoslav Albums published by the Croatian edition of Rolling Stone.

In 2006, "Program tvog kompjutera" was polled No.77 on the B92 Top 100 Yugoslav songs list.

Discography

Studio albums 
 Čuvaj se! (1984)
 Ja sam lažljiva (1985)
 Budi tu (1988)
 Restart (2013)

Compilation albums 
 Program tvog kompjutera (1995)
 The Best of Denis & Denis (2006)
 2 na 1 (2010)

Singles 
 "Program tvog kompjutera" / "Noć" (1984)
 "Oaze snova" / "Voli me još ovu noć" (1985)
 "Bengalski tigar" / "Bio sam dijete" (1987)

References 

Croatian rock music groups
Croatian pop music groups
Yugoslav rock music groups
Yugoslav synthpop groups
Musical groups established in 1982
1982 establishments in Yugoslavia
Musicians from Rijeka
Beovizija contestants